Among the sports broadcasters in Brazil are the subscription channels ESPN, SporTV, Fox Sports, BandSports; the pay-per-view channels Premiere FC; and the subscription video streaming services HBO Max, Star+, DAZN and Eleven Sports.

Association Football (Soccer)

Brazilian tournaments

National Championships
Rede Globo
SporTV
Premiere
TNT Sports (via HBO Max or TNT/Space due to the end of the channel)
DAZN Brasil
Eleven Sports Brasil
TV Brasil

Globo broadcasts games of the First Division (Série A) only, on Wednesday nights and Sunday afternoon. The games are regionally divided. Globo has the rights to broadcast all games.

SporTV broadcasts games from both First and Second Division (Série B). On the first division, SporTV can only broadcast games from: Atlético-GO, Atlético-MG, Botafogo, Bragantino, Corinthians, Flamengo, Fluminense, Goiás, Grêmio, São Paulo, Sport and Vasco. On the second division, SporTV has the rights to broadcast all games, but the channel reserves some games for its sister PPV channel, Premiere.

Premiere (Globo's PPV channel) has the rights to broadcast games from both First and Second Division. On the first division, Premiere can broadcast games from all teams, except Athletico-PR (38 games). On the second division, Premiere has the rights to broadcast all games.

After long negotiations, TNT sports got the rights to broadcast games from Athletico, Bahia, Coritiba, Ceará, Fortaleza, Internacional, Palmeiras and Santos. On games that both teams have contract with TNT sports, TNT or Space broadcast the game exclusively on Cable TV, meaning that Globo can still broadcast them. On games that one of the teams has contract with Premiere and the other with TNT sports, the game is broadcast by TNT or Space and Premiere.

DAZN broadcasts and TV Nsports (app) share the rights for most part of the games from the Third Division (Série C).

Eleven Sports (app) and TV Brasil share the rights for most part of the games from the Fourth Division (Série D).

State Championships
Rede Globo
SporTV
Premiere
SBT

Globo, SporTV and Premiere also broadcast the major part of the pre-season state championships. In 2020, Globo and FERJ had a disagreement, due to broadcasting rights for Flamengo's games. FERJ deactivated their contract with Globo, allowing teams to choose whether or not broadcast their games on the TV channel. Flamengo and multiple teams chose to broadcast their remaining games on their respective channels on YouTube. The final game was broadcast by SBT after negotiations between the channel and Flamengo and Fluminense FC.

Copa do Brasil (Brazil Cup)
Rede Globo
SporTV
Premiere

Globo, SporTV and Premiere broadcast all the games from Copa do Brasil.

European tournaments

Premier League (England)

ESPN Brasil
Star+

ESPN and FOX Sports broadcast all games.

FA Cup (England)

ESPN Brasil

EFL Cup (England)

ESPN Brasil
Star+

La Liga (Spain)

ESPN Brasil
Star+

Serie A (Italy)

ESPN Brasil
Star+

Eredivise (Netherlands)

ESPN Brasil
Star+

Bundesliga (Germany)

Band
Onefootball (App)

Band can broadcast one game per matchweek and usually the channel chooses games from Sunday morning.

Ligue 1 (France)

ESPN Brasil
Star+

Primeira Liga (Portugal)
ESPN Brasil
Star+

Russian Premier League (Russia)
Band

UEFA Champions League

SBT
TNT Sports (via TNT/Space)
HBO Max

UEFA Europa League

ESPN Brasil
SBT
TV Cultura

UEFA Super Cup

SBT
TNT Sports (via TNT/Space)

UEFA European Championship
TBA

Latin American, Caribbean & North American tournaments

Copa Libertadores

TV Globo
ESPN
Star+
Paramount+

Copa Sudamericana

SBT
ESPN
Star+
Paramount+

LPF (Argentina)

ESPN Brasil
Star+

MLS (United States)

Apple TV app

USL (United States)
Star+

Copa América
TBA

International (worldwide) tournaments

FIFA Club World Cup

Rede Globo
SporTV
Rede Bandeirantes
BandSports

FIFA World Cup

Rede Globo
SporTV

Brazilian national team games 
Rede Globo
SporTV

Australian Football 
Star+
Finals Series: Every match live nationally including the Grand Final.

Athletics

Diamond League
SporTV
BandSports

Marathons
SporTV
BandSports

Some important World Marathon Majors, such as the New York City, London, Berlin and Tokyo marathons, and other major competitions like the Paris and Sydney marathons, among others, are split between these two channels.

Saint Silvester Road Race
Rede Globo
TV Gazeta

World Athletics Series
BandSports

Some major competitions like the World Athletics Championships are transmitted by this channel.

Baseball

MLB

ESPN Brasil
FOX Sports
Star+

ESPN only broadcasts games that are originally broadcast by the american ESPN. The same applies to FOX Sports.

Basketball

College Basketball (USA)
ESPN Brasil

NBA

ESPN Brasil
Star+
Amazon Prime Video
SporTV
YouTube
Band

ESPN mostly broadcasts games originally broadcast by the american ESPN. SporTV usually broadcasts games aired on TNT in the US, but using the graphic package of the NBA International League Pass. The same applies to Band in terms of graphic package, but the station only has the rights to broadcast games on Sunday and Thursday nights. The NBA Brazil channel on YouTube started to occasionally broadcast games after a partnership with Budweiser.

NBB
TV Cultura
ESPN Brasil
DAZN

WNBA
ESPN Brasil

Basketball Africa League
ESPN Brasil

Beach Soccer 
Rede Globo
SporTV
BandSports

Globo broadcasts beach soccer games on a segment inside Esporte Espetacular (Spetacular Sport), a classic Sunday morning sports show. SporTV broadcasts the major part of the games, including the World Cup and Band Sports usually broadcasts the South American Cup.

Cricket 

ESPN Brasil and Star+: Cricket World Cup, ICC World Cup Qualifier, ICC World Twenty20, ICC T20 World Cup Qualifier, Under 19 Cricket World Cup, Regional Super50 and Australia national cricket team

Cycling

Road cycling 
ESPN Brasil (major events, including the Grand Tour)
Rai Italia (only the Giro d'Italia)

Rai Italia broadcasts their signal in their international feed, which includes Brazil.

Track cycling 

SporTV (only major competitions, such as the World Championships)

Combat Sports

Boxing
ESPN Brasil
Dream Boxing: DAZN: October 2022 to October 2025, all fights

Kickboxing
King of Kings: DAZN: October 2022 to October 2025, all fights

Mixed Martial Arts
Bellator MMA: ESPN Brasil
Bushido MMA: DAZN: October 2022 to October 2025, all fights 
Invicta Fighting Championships: Combate
Konfrontacja Sztuk Walki: Combate
One Championship: Combate
Rizin Fighting Federation: Combate
UFC: *UFC Fight Pass

Futsal

FIFA Futsal World Cup
Rede Globo
SporTV

Globo broadcasts the final of the World Cup on a segment inside Esporte Espetacular if Brazil is participating. SporTV (Globo's sports channel) broadcasts the whole tournament.

LNF
Rede Globo
SporTV
TV Brasil

SporTV broadcasts the major part of the games, TV Brasil covers the small part of the games and Globo broadcasts the final of the tournament on a segment inside Esporte Espetacular.

Golf 
ESPN Brasil (important events, including the major championships)

Gridiron Football

American Football

College Football (USA)
ESPN Brasil

NFL

 ESPN Brasil
 Star+

ESPN Brazil broadcasts approximately four games on Sunday and all primetime games despite the original network (CBS, FOX, NBC and ESPN). After the merge, ESPN shared its broadcasting rights with FOX Sports, and now the second broadcasts one "FOX late game" on Sunday afternoon.

XFL

 ESPN Brasil

BFA
 ESPN Brasil

ESPN does not broadcast a lot of games due to a lack of "help" from the teams, but does broadcast the final game.

Canadian Football

CFL 
ESPN Brasil

Handball 
Star +: European Men's Handball Championship; European Women's Handball Championship

Lacrosse
Star+

Major League Lacrosse

Women's Professional Lacrosse League

National Lacrosse League

Premier Lacrosse League

Motor Sports

Automobile racing

Copa HB20
BandSports

Copa Truck
Band
SporTV

Dakar Rally
Fox Sports

DTM
BandSports

F1

Band
BandSports

After 27 years, Globo lost the F1 broadcasting rights to Band. The second, now broadcasts the races on Sundays live and on free-to-air TV. The Free Practices and Qualifying are broadcast on BandSports, Band's sports network only available on cable TV.

F2
BandSports

F3
BandSports

FE

TV Cultura

IndyCar Series
Band (Indianapolis 500 only)
BandSports
DAZN

Mercedes-Benz Challenge
BandSports

NASCAR
 BandSports

Porsche Carrera Cup Brasil
SporTV

Stock Car Brasil
Band
SporTV

Stock Car Light
BandSports

WRC

Fox Sports

Motorcycle racing

MotoGP

Fox Sports

Superbike
ESPN Brasil

Superbike Brasil
RedeTV!

Olympic Games 
Rede Globo
SporTV
Globoplay

Globo broadcast all the Olympic Games in the modern era so far, with the exception of the 2012 Summer Olympics and the 2010 Winter Olympics.

SporTV, Globo's sports channel on cable television, broadcast all the games. In the 2016 Summer Olympics, the channel launched 13 HD extra channels on cable to celebrate and broadcast all of the events of the Rio Olympics. The channels were available on most cable providers and anyone with a SporTV subscription already included in their account could access them.

Globoplay, Globo's streaming service, started to broadcast the Olympics in the 2020 Summer Olympics. The service provided users that paid for the "Globoplay + Live Channels" plan with 52 live OBS feeds with no commentary. In a partnership with NHK, Globoplay provided users with 8K special broadcasts in the same games.

Pan-American Games 
SporTV

Padel 
ESPN Premier Padel and APT Padel Tour.

Rugby

Rugby sevens 

 BandSports (only major competitions, such as the World Cup)
 ESPN Brasil (only the World Rugby Sevens Series)

Rugby union 
 ESPN Brasil

ESPN has the rights to broadcast all the major rugby tournaments.

Surfing 
ESPN Brasil (only the WSL)

Table Tennis 
World Table Tennis Championships
World Table Tennis

Tennis 
ESPN Brasil (Australian Open and U.S. Open as well as ATP Finals, ATP Masters 1000, ATP 500, ATP 250, WTA Finals, WTA 1000, WTA 500 and WTA 250)
SporTV (U.S. Open and Wimbledon)
BandSports (French Open)

Volleyball 

SporTV airs the FIVB and South American indoor and beach volleyball tournaments, and the Brazilian Men's Volleyball Superliga, Brazilian Women's Volleyball Superliga and Brazilian Beach Volleyball Circuit. Rede Globo broadcasts the Superliga final games on a segment inside Esporte Espetacular.
 NSports also airs Brazilian Men's Volleyball Superliga and Brazilian Women's Volleyball Superliga through "Canal Vôlei Brasil"
Star+ airs the Italian Volleyball League.

Winter Sports 
SporTV (major events, like World Cups and World Championships, in most sports)
ESPN Brasil (only major figure skating championships)

Ice Hockey

World Championships
ESPN Brasil

NHL

ESPN Brasil

ESPN broadcasts a major part of the games.

Wrestling

WWE
Fox Sports

AEW
Space
TNT Sports (via Space)

X Games 
ESPN Brasil (both Summer and Winter)

References 

Brazil
Television in Brazil